Petar Šuto (born 29 June 1980 in Imotski) is a Croatian football midfielder,.

Club career
Šuto started his career playing at youth level for Croatia Zmijavci until joining a Hajduk Split youth Academy. He signed a four-year professional contract and moved to NK Mosor into loan. Then he played for HNK Šibenik and NK Posušje, but has not returned to Split, but he was signed by NK Imotski.

He later moved to Cibalia and after a half-season returned to Hajduk Split. Already in the first match against Shelbourne he scored his first goal. Later has Hajduk eliminated and Šuto failed to retain a place in the first team. He is varied from the stand, over the bench to full-time slots but its speed is not succeeded to keep on the right wing of more than 20 games in two seasons.
He on a Prva HNL for the 2004–05 season, and after a (not) playing in one of the worst seasons for the club, Luka Bonačić, and later Zoran Vulić were not counted on him for the 2006–07 season. Then he joined NK Posušje and after six month he moved to the hometown club NK Imotski.

References

External links
 

1980 births
Living people
Sportspeople from Imotski
Association football midfielders
Croatian footballers
HNK Hajduk Split players
NK Mosor players
HNK Šibenik players
HŠK Posušje players
NK Imotski players
HNK Cibalia players
NK Croatia Zmijavci players
Croatian Football League players
Premier League of Bosnia and Herzegovina players
Croatian expatriate footballers
Expatriate footballers in Bosnia and Herzegovina
Croatian expatriate sportspeople in Bosnia and Herzegovina